Pitt Rivers Museum is a museum displaying the archaeological and anthropological collections of the University of Oxford in England. The museum is located to the east of the Oxford University Museum of Natural History, and can only be accessed through that building.

The museum was founded in 1884 by Augustus Pitt Rivers, who donated his private collection to the University of Oxford with the condition that a permanent lecturer in anthropology must be appointed. Edward Burnett Tylor thereby became the first lecturer in anthropology in the UK following his appointment to the post of Reader in Anthropology in 1885. Museum staff are still involved in teaching archaeology and anthropology at the university. The first curator of the museum was Henry Balfour. A second stipulation in the Deed of Gift was that a building should be provided to house the collection and used for no other purpose. The university therefore engaged Thomas Manly Deane, son of Thomas Newenham Deane who, together with Benjamin Woodward, had designed and built the original Oxford University Museum of Natural History building three decades earlier, to create an adjoining building at the rear of the main building to house the collection. Construction started in 1885 and was completed in 1886.

The original donation consisted of approximately 22,000 items; this has now grown to more than 500,000 items, many of which have been donated by travelers, scholars, and missionaries.

Organization
The exhibition space in the museum's building is a large, rectangular, colonnaded room. It has two mezzanine levels and a massive, vaulted ceiling, and is brimming with glass display cases and exhibits.

The museum's collection is arranged typologically, according to how the objects were used, rather than according to their age or origin. The display of many examples of a particular type of tool or artifact, showing historical and regional variations, is an unusual and distinct feature of this museum. This topological layout is based upon Augustus Henry Lane Fox Pitt Rivers' theories; he intended for his collection to show progression in design and evolution in human culture from the simple to the complex. Although this evolutionary approach to material culture is no longer appropriate in the modern display paradigm for archaeological and anthropological objects, the museum has broadly retained the original typological organization due to the Pitt Rivers Deed of Gift which stipulated that any changes to the displays "shall not affect the general principle originated by Augustus Henry Lane Fox Pitt Rivers".

As the museum has an extensive collection of objects; those on display are changed periodically.

The museum was closed due to the COVID-19 quarantine. The museum was closed from 17 March 2020 to 22 September 2020. During this closure, a decision was made to remove displays of shrunken heads as well as other human remains. The museum's director issued a statement, "Exhibiting Tsantsas (shrunken heads) reinforced racist and stereotypical thinking that goes against the museum’s core values.” The shrunken heads had been on display since the 1940s.

The Haida Totem Pole

The largest object on display in the museum is the Haida house post, a totem pole, which has a height of 11.36m. It originally stood in front of the Star House in the village of Old Massett (Haida name Uttewas), on Graham Island, in British Columbia, Canada. The Star House belonged to Chief Anetlas (c.1816–1893); it is thought that the house was constructed in 1882. The pole was purchased by Edward Burnett Tylor and transported to the Pitt Rivers Museum in 1901.

Photo Gallery

Expansion
In 2004, the museum received £3,700,000 from the Higher Education Funding Council for England (HEFCE) to build an annex adjoining the museum. Building work was completed in 2007, bringing the academic staff of the museum back to the site, and providing a laboratory for conservation of the specimens.

A second phase of development began on 7 July 2008 necessitating the closure of the museum and galleries. The museum reopened on 1 May 2009. In this work, the 1960s exhibition gallery was dismantled, restoring the original view through to the museum's totem pole. Original display cases were returned to their original place at the front of the museum. The space upstairs vacated by these cases provides additional space for a Clore Duffield Education Centre. A new entrance platform was built to allow visitors to enter on the same level as the Oxford University Museum of Natural History and improves access for wheelchair users and parents with pushchairs. The entrance platform provides re-located shop and reception areas. An environmental control system was also installed.

Awards
The Pitt Rivers Museum, along with the Oxford University Museum of Natural History, won The Guardian newspaper's award for Family Friendly Museum of 2005.

In 2019, the Pitt Rivers Museum was finalist of the Art Fund Museum of the Year Award.

Colonial legacy 
In recent years, the Pitt Rivers Museum has been called sector-leading in its work on decoloniality. Further details can be found on the website.

In September 2020, the museum announced it had made a number of critical changes to its displays, including the removal from display of human remains and the installation of a new Introductory Case as an intervention in its permanent galleries that engages with the colonial legacy of the museum. The museum has also said that it would make changes to the labels to include stories "through the voices of artists and indigenous leaders".

As part of this process the Pitt Rivers Museum is meeting with originating communities to address errors and gaps in the information it stores, and to discuss repatriation. One of these is the Living Cultures initiative, a collaboration between the museum, a Maasai community based campaign group called Oltoilo Le Maa, and community development organisation InsightShare. Additionally, the museum, together with the Museum of Natural History, returned the remains of 17 Aborigines to the Australian government in 2022.

Notable people

 Henry Balfour (curator)
 Beatrice Blackwood (curator, anthropologist)
 Elizabeth Edwards (curator, historian of photography)
 Bernard Fagg (curator, archaeologist), curator
 Barbara Freire-Marreco (anthropologist)
 Chris Gosden (archaeologist)
 Clare Harris (curator for Asian Collections)
 Schuyler Jones (American anthropologist)
 Margaret Staples-Browne (Makereti) (Maori anthropologist)
 Howard Morphy (anthropologist)
 Edward Burnett Tylor (anthropologist)

See also
 Museums of the University of Oxford
 Ashmolean Museum
 Museum of Oxford
 Museum of the History of Science, Oxford
 Museum of Archaeology and Anthropology, University of Cambridge

References

Further reading
 Baumgarten, Lothar.  Unsettled Objects.  Edition of Guggenheim Magazine published in conjunction with the exhibition AMERICA Invention.  New York: Solomon R. Guggenheim Museum, 1993. (Contains photographic documention of the Pitt Rivers' collection and essays on ethnographic collecting)
 Chapman, William Ryan.  "Arranging Ethnology: A. H. L. F. Pitt Rivers and the Typological Tradition."  In Objects and Others: Essays on Museums and Material Culture.  Edited by George W. Stocking, Jr.  Madison: University of Wisconsin Press, 1985.
 Cranstone, B.A.L. and Steven Seidenberg.  The General's Gift: A Celebration of the Pitt Rivers Museum Centenary, 1884–1984.  Oxford: JASO, 1984.
 Hicks, Dan and Alive Stevenson (eds) 2013. World Archaeology at the Pitt Rivers Museum: a characterization. Oxford: Archaeopress. World Archaeology at the Pitt Rivers Museum

External links

Rethinking Pitt Rivers

Houses completed in 1884
Museums established in 1884
Archaeological museums in England
Anthropology museums in England
Musical instrument museums in England
Grade I listed buildings in Oxford
Museums of the University of Oxford
Ethnographic museums in England
History of the University of Oxford
History of museums
Grade I listed museum buildings